Count of Vila Real (in Portuguese Conde de Vila Real) was a Portuguese title of nobility created by a royal decree, in 1424, by King John I of Portugal, and granted to Dom Pedro de Menezes, also known as Peter I of Menezes, 1st Count of Viana (do Alentejo).

The Menezes, a high nobility and influential family, quite close to the first Dynasty Kings in Portugal, we’re negatively affected when the new Aviz Kings came to power, after the 1383-1385 crisis, but Pedro de Menezes supported the new king John of Aviz and was later rewarded.

He was involved in the north African conquests, and became the first Governor of Ceuta after the Portuguese conquest (1415).

He married four times from which he had three daughters. The eldest was Beatrice of Menezes, married to Fernando of Noronha (grandson of King Fernando I of Portugal through his mother, Infanta Isabel of Portugal). Their issue used Menezes as family name and they originated the powerful House of Vila Real (extinct in 1641).

Later, in the 19th Century, King John VI of Portugal, revived the title and granted it by royal decree on July 3, 1823 (second creation), to José Luis de Sousa Botelho Mourão e Vasconcelos (1785-1855), a remarkable military and politician who fought during the Napoleonic invasions and the Liberal wars.

List of the Counts of Vila Real

First creation (1424 - Menezes family)
Pedro de Menezes, 1st Count of Vila Real
Brites de Menezes and her husband Fernando of Noronha, 2nd Counts of Vila Real;
Pedro II of Menezes, 3rd Count of Vila Real (1425-1499), who became 1st Marquis of Vila Real in 1489;
(for the following counts, see Marquis of Vila Real)

Second creation (1823 - Sousa Botelho family)
José Luis de Sousa Botelho Mourão e Vasconcelos (1785-1855);
Fernando de Sousa Botelho Mourão e Vasconcelos (1815-1858)
José Luís de Sousa Botelho Mourão e Vasconcelos (1843-1923);
Maria Teresa de Sousa Botelho e Melo (1871- ? ), also 3rd Countess of Melo and Countess of Mangualde by marriage;
Francisco de Sousa Botelho e Albuquerque (1909-1966), also 3rd Count of Mangualde and 4th Count of Melo.

See also
Duke of Vila Real
Marquis of Vila Real
Duke of Caminha
List of Portuguese Dukedoms
List of Marquesses in Portugal
List of Countships in Portugal

Bibliography
"Nobreza de Portugal e do Brasil" – Vol. III, pages 522/528. Published by Zairol Lda., Lisbon 1989.

Vila Real
1424 establishments in Portugal